L'ancêtre ("The Ancestor") is a 1905  in 3 acts by Camille Saint-Saëns to a libretto by Lucien Augé de Lassus (1841-1914). 

Celebrated soprano Geraldine Farrar created the role of Margarita. The vocal score, published in 1906 by Durand et Fils of Paris has a dedication to Albert I, Prince of Monaco. 

The plot is set during the First French Empire in Corsica, which composer and librettist visited together, looking for local colour.

Roles
 (baritone)
 (tenor)
 (bass)
 (soprano)
 (soprano)
 (contralto)

Parents, serviteurs des deux familles Piétra Néra et Fabiani
("Parents, servants of the two families: Piétra Néra and Fabiani")

References

See also

Free score of L'ancêtre at the International Music Score Library Project (IMSLP) 

Operas
Operas by Camille Saint-Saëns
French-language operas
1905 operas